The following units and commanders fought in the Battle of Eylau of the Napoleonic Wars.

French Army
Emperor Napoleon I of France

III Corps
Marshal Davout

IV Corps
Marshal Soult

VI Corps
Marshal Ney

VII Corps
Marshal Augereau

Imperial Guard

Reserve Cavalry
Marshal Murat

Russian Army 
General of Cavalry Count Bennigsen

Chief of Staff: Quartermaster-General, Major General F.F. Steinheil

Fourth Division

Major General A.A. Somov

Cavalry

Brigade MG Baron Friedrich von Korff
 St. George (Order) Cuirassiers (5 sqs)
 Pskov Dragoons (5 sqs)
 Polish Horse (10 sqs)
 Grekov 9 Cossacks (5 sotnias)
 Grekov 18 Cossacks (5 sotnias)

Infantry

Brigade MG Somov
 Tula Musketeers (3 bns)
 Tengisk Musketeers (3 bns)

Brigade MG Arseniev 2
 Tobolsk Musketeers (3 bns)
 Polotzk Musketeers (3 bns)

Brigade MG Barclay de Tolly
 Kostroma Musketeers (3 bns)
 3rd Jaegers (3 bns)

Artillery

Brigade Col Prince Yashvil 2
 Battery Company Maj Savitsky (12 guns)
 Battery Company Maj Kudryavtsev (12 guns)
 Light Company Maj Yushkov (12 guns)
 Light Company Maj Brimmer (12 guns)
 Light Company Maj Mikulin (12 guns)
 Horse Company Col Prince Yashvil 2 (12 guns)

Engineers

 Pontoon Company of Major Artsibashev
 1st Pioneer Regiment, Miner Company of Captain Gebner 1

Fifth Division

Lieutenant General N.A. Tuchkov I

Cavalry

Brigade MG Prince Golitsyn
 Riga Dragoons (5 sqs)
 Kasan Dragoons (5 sqs)
 Elisabethgrad Hussars (10 sqs)
 Lithuanian Horse (10 sqs)
 Gordeev 1 Cossacks (5 sotnias)

Infantry

Brigade ?
 Sievsk Musketeers (3 bns)
 [Kaluga Musketeers (3 bns) Detached to Prussians; not present]

Brigade MG Ivan Leontiev
 Perm Musketeers (3 bns)
 Mohilev Musketeers (3 bns)

Brigade Col Priouda
 24th Jaegers (3 bns)
 25th Jaegers (3 bns)

Artillery

Brigade Col Count Sievers
 Battery Company Col Count Sievers (12 guns) 
 Battery Company Maj Sigismund (12 guns)
 Light Company Maj Klingenberg (12 guns)
 Horse Company Maj Obleuhov 1st (12 guns)

Troops from the Sixth Division

From the Cavalry Brigade
Alexandria Hussars (10 sqs)
Popov 5 Cossacks (5 sotnias)

From the Infantry

Brigade MG K.F. Baggovut
Starooskol Musketeers (3 bns)
4th Jaegers (3 bns)

From the Artillery Brigade
 Battery Company Lt-Col Vasil’ev (12 guns)
 Horse Company Col Merlin (12 guns)
 Light Company in two Light platoons (12 guns)

Seventh Division

Lieutenant General D.S. Dokhturov

Cavalry

Brigade MG Chaplits
 Moscow Dragoons (5 sqs)
 Ingermannland Dragoons (5 sqs)
 Pavlograd Hussars (10 sqs)
 Malachov Cossacks (5 sotnias)
 Andronov 1 Cossacks (5 sotnias)

Infantry

Brigade MG A.V. Zapol'skii
 Ekaterinoslav Grenadiers (3 bns)
 Moscow Musketeers (3 bns)

Brigade MG Straton-Potapov
 Vladimir Musketeers (3 bns)
 Voronezh Musketeers (3 bns)

Brigade MG Markov 1
 Pskov Musketeers (3 bns)
 Azov Musketeers (3 bns)
 5th Jaegers (3 bns)

Artillery

Brigade Col Ermolov
 Battery Company Maj Ansio (12 guns) 
 Battery Company Maj Shulman 2nd (12 guns) 
 Light Company Maj Kondratiev (12 guns) 
 Light Company Maj Panfilov (12 guns) 
 Light Company Maj Krivtsov (12 guns)
 Horse Company Col Ermolov (12 guns)

Engineers

2nd Pioneer Regiment, Pioneer Company Maj Berg

Eighth Division

Lieutenant General P.K. Essen 3

Cavalry

Brigade MG P.F. Glebov-Streshnev
 Petersburg Dragoons (5 sqs)
 Livland Dragoons (5 sqs)
 Olviopol Hussars (10 sqs)
 Kieselev Cossacks (5 sotnias)
 Sysojev Cossacks (5 sotnias)

Infantry

Brigade MG Zakhar Dmitrievich Olsufiev
 Moscow Grenadiers (3 bns)
[* Viburg Musketeers Detached; fought with Prussian Corps]

Brigade MG Engelhardt 1
 Schlusselburg Musketeers (3 bns)
 Staroingermannland Musketeers (3 bns)

Brigade MG Levitsky
 Podolsk Musketeers (1 Musketeer bn)
 Archangelgorod Musketeers (3 bns)
 7th Jaegers (3 bns)

Artillery

Brigade Col Nowak 1
 Battery Company Maj Nepeytsyn (12 guns) 
 Battery Company Maj Kolotinski (12 guns)
 Battery Company Maj Tatpykov (12 guns) 
 Battery Company Maj Bastian 2d (12 guns) 
 Horse Company Col Nowak 1st (12 guns)

Engineers

2nd Pioneer Regiment, Miner Company of Maj Zapreev

Fourteenth Division

Major General Count N.M. Kamensky 2d

Cavalry

Brigade Col D.D. Sheplev [Brigade may not have been present]
 Finland Dragoons (5 squadrons)
 Mitau Dragoons (5 squadrons) 
 Grodno Hussars (10 squadrons) [Not present.  Arrived at the army the day after the battle]

Infantry

Brigade MG Alekseev
 Belozersk Musketeers (3 bns)
 Ryazan Musketeers (3 bns)

Brigade MG Gersdorf
 Uglits Musketeers (3 bns)
 Sofia Musketeers (3 bns)

Artillery

Brigade Col Pyotr Papkov
 Battery Company Col Papkov 2d (12 guns)
 Light Company Maj Vitovtov (12 guns)
 Light Company Maj Green (12 guns)

Engineers

Pontoon Company of Major Rutkovski

Prussian artillery temporarily attached to the Russian Army's Right Flank at Eylau

Maj von Brockhausen

 12–pound Battery Brockhausen Nr 34 (8 guns)
 12-pound Battery Kulikke Nr 37 (8 guns) 
 6-pound Battery Wedekind Nr 8 (10 guns)

Prussian Corps

General Staff 

 Commander-in-chief: Lieutenant General Anton Wilhelm von L'Estocq
 General-Quartermaster-Lieutenant: Col Gerhard von Scharnhorst

Organization

Sources 
 Cowan, Coley E. "Winter Battle: Eylau 1807". Strategy & Tactics Magazine, number 228 (May/June 2005).  ISSN 1040-886X
 Smith, Digby. The Napoleonic Wars Data Book. London: Greenhill, 1998. 
  Vasil'ev, AA, "COMPOSITION of ALLIED TROOPS at EYLAU: List of the Allied Russian and Prussian troops participating in the Battle of Preussisch-Eylau January 26 and 27 (February 7 and 8) 1807", Imperator No. 11 pp. 11–14 (2007)

Eylau

fr:Ordre de bataille lors de la bataille d'Eylau